Who Breaks... Pays is a 1975 Italian-Turkish comedy film directed by Giorgio Ferroni and starring  Giancarlo Prete and Brad Harris.

Plot

Cast  
Giancarlo Prete as Antonio
Brad Harris as  Placido
Gianni Rizzo as Paul
Lars Bloch as  Captain McConny
Giovanni Cianfriglia as  Brusio
 Birtane Gungor as  Flower 
Muzaffer Tema

See also
 List of Italian films of 1975

References

External links

1975 comedy films
1975 films
Italian comedy films
Films directed by Giorgio Ferroni
Turkish comedy films
Films set in Istanbul
1970s Italian films